Turks was an American police drama television series created by Robert Singer, that aired on CBS from January 21, 1999 to April 23, 1999.

Premise
Set in Chicago, the series centered on the Turks, an Irish American family of police officers and their work and family lives. The hangout for the cops was called Emmitts.

Cast
William Devane as Sgt. Joseph Turk
David Cubitt as Mike Turk
Matthew John Armstrong as Joey Turk
Michael Muhney as Paul Turk
Helen Carey as Mary Turk
Sarah Trigger as Erin Turk
Ashley Crow as Ginny

Episodes

References

External links

1990s American crime drama television series
1999 American television series debuts
1999 American television series endings
CBS original programming
1990s American police procedural television series
Television shows set in Chicago
Television series by Universal Television